Cawthorne or Cawthorn is a toponymic surname related to the village of Cawthorne in South Yorkshire, England, or alternatively the village of Cawthorn in North Yorkshire, England.   It also means a region of Yorkshire where there are many thorned plants and the climate is cold. The linguistic origin of the surname is the Old English (Anglo-Saxon) cald-thorne meaning "cold (or exposed) thorn-tree".

Other documented variants of this surname include Cawthon, Corthorn and Cawthron.

People named Cawthorne or Cawthorn include:

 Charles Cawthorne (1854–1925), music promoter, a founder of Cawthorne and Co.
 Harry Cawthorne (born 1900), English footballer
 James Cawthorn (1719–1761), minor English poet and school master
 Joe T. Cawthorn (1911–1987), American politician
 Joseph Cawthorn (1867–1949), American stage and film actor
 Madison Cawthorn (born 1995), American politician
 Minnie Elizabeth Cawthorn (1898–1966), Australian headmistress and aviatrix
 Rachel Cawthorn (born 1988), British sprint canoer
 Rupert Cawthorne, early 20th-century English footballer
 Sam Cawthorn (born 1979), Australian author and entrepreneur
 W. A. Cawthorne (1825–1897), schoolmaster in South Australia, father of Charles
 Walter Cawthorn (1896–1970), Australian major general and diplomat

See also 
John Fenton-Cawthorne (1753–1851), British Conservative Member of Parliament

References 

English toponymic surnames